Gobiobotia cheni is a species of small freshwater fish in the family Cyprinidae. It is endemic to Taiwan.

Named in honor of vertebrate zoologist Jianshen (“Johnson”) T. F. Chen (1898-1988), Director, National Taiwan Museum (Taipei), who provided type specimens.

References

 

Gobiobotia
Taxa named by Petre Mihai Bănărescu
Taxa named by Teodor T. Nalbant
Fish described in 1966